Philo is a village about nine miles south of Urbana in Champaign County, Illinois, United States. The population was 1,392 at the 2020 census.

Geography
Philo is located three miles south of Urbana township and six miles south of the city of Urbana at  (40.005359, -88.156483).  The legend "Center of the Universe" is painted on the village water tower, along with its zipcode.

Philo was named after the founder Philo Hale.  The main park, which is used for numerous functions including reserved space for family reunions, located on the north end of the village is named after the founder (Hale Park).

Demographics

As of the 2020 census there were 1,392 people, 463 households, and 360 families residing in the village. The racial makeup of the village was 94.90% White, 0.22% African American, 0.22% Native American, 0.22% Asian, 0.29% Pacific Islander, 0.93% from other races, and 3.23% from two or more races. Hispanic or Latino of any race were 0.72% of the population.

There were 463 households, out of which 66.52% had children under the age of 18 living with them, 65.44% were married couples living together, 12.31% had a female householder with no husband present, and 22.25% were non-families. 16.63% of all households were made up of individuals, and 7.78% had someone living alone who was 65 years of age or older. The average household size was 3.37 and the average family size was 3.02.

The village's age distribution consisted of 25.4% under the age of 18, 7.2% from 18 to 24, 28.4% from 25 to 44, 24.9% from 45 to 64, and 13.9% who were 65 years of age or older. The median age was 39.1 years. For every 100 females, there were 87.9 males. For every 100 females age 18 and over, there were 91.7 males.

The median income for a household in the village was $91,156, and the median income for a family was $93,889. Males had a median income of $43,690 versus $36,090 for females. The per capita income for the village was $36,383. No families and 3.1% of the population were below the poverty line, including 9.6% of those under age 18 and 3.6% of those age 65 or over.

Education
Philo is in the Unit 7 School District based in nearby Tolono. Residents attend Unity East Elementary, Unity Junior High, and Unity High School.

Philo also has a Catholic Grade School, St. Thomas, for grades pre-K through 8th, and in nearby Champaign is the High School of Saint Thomas More

References

External links

 Early history of Philo, Illinois
 Daniel Lincicome (1975). Philo Area Centennial 1875-1975. Philo Area Centennial Corporation.

Villages in Champaign County, Illinois
Villages in Illinois